Jan Hrdina (born February 5, 1976) is a Czech former professional ice hockey player.

Playing career 
Hrdina was drafted by the Pittsburgh Penguins in the 1995 NHL Entry Draft in the 5th round, 128th overall.

In March 2003, the Pittsburgh Penguins traded Hrdina and François Leroux to the Phoenix Coyotes for Ramzi Abid, Dan Focht and Guillaume Lefebvre. One year later, March 2004, the Phoenix Coyotes traded him to the New Jersey Devils for Michael Rupp and a second-round draft pick in the 2004 NHL Entry Draft.

On August 28, 2006, Hrdina signed a six-month contract with the Swedish elite club HV71 in Elitserien. He joined the club on October 18, 2006, due to some Swedish tax laws concerning the specific type of contract signed. Before that he started the season 2006–07 playing for HIFK in the Finnish SM-liiga. After the season, he extended the contract for another two years

Hrdina played three games with Swedish Elitserien club HV71 during the 2008–09 season. Because of an ongoing hip problem, Hrdina returned to the United States to have surgery.

In an interview from July 2011, Hrdina commented that he was retired from professional hockey due to two hip surgeries on the same hip, which put loads of pressure on his leg when skating. Aside from the hip surgery, Hrdina has also admitted that he had problems with his groin and back over the previous five or six years.

Personal
Since his retirement, Hrdina has returned to his hometown of Hradec Kralove where he is a member of the Czech Extraliga board.

Hrdina has two children; a daughter (born 2008) and a son (born 2010).

Awards
 Swedish Champion with HV71 in 2008.

Career statistics

Regular season and playoffs

Statistics as of February 2, 2010.

International

Statistics as of January 14, 2019.

Salary Information

External links

References 

1976 births
Cleveland Lumberjacks players
Columbus Blue Jackets players
Czech ice hockey centres
Rytíři Kladno players
HIFK (ice hockey) players
HV71 players
Ice hockey players at the 2002 Winter Olympics
Living people
New Jersey Devils players
Olympic ice hockey players of the Czech Republic
Sportspeople from Hradec Králové
Phoenix Coyotes players
Pittsburgh Penguins draft picks
Pittsburgh Penguins players
Seattle Thunderbirds players
Spokane Chiefs players
Syracuse Crunch players
Czech expatriate ice hockey players in the United States
Czech expatriate ice hockey players in Sweden
Czech expatriate ice hockey players in Finland